List of airports in Ireland may refer to:
 List of airports in the Republic of Ireland
 List of airports in the United Kingdom and the British Crown Dependencies#Northern Ireland